"Ends" is a song by American musician Everlast, released in 1998 via Tommy Boy Records as the second single from his sophomore studio album, Whitey Ford Sings the Blues (1998). The song was written by Everlast and Dante Ross and was produced by Ross and John Gamble. "Ends" reached number seven on the US Billboard Modern Rock Tracks chart and number 13 on the Billboard Mainstream Rock chart.

Track listings

Charts

Release history

References

External links 
 

1998 songs
1999 singles
Everlast (musician) songs
Tommy Boy Records singles